The Parkside Rangers (previously Wisconsin–Parkside Rangers or UW–Parkside Rangers) are the athletic teams that represent the University of Wisconsin–Parkside, located in Somers, in NCAA Division II intercollegiate sports. The Rangers compete as members of Great Lakes Intercollegiate Athletic Conference (GLIAC) for 12 of 13 sports; the wrestling team competes in the Northern Sun Intercollegiate Conference (NSIC). 

UW–Parkside has been a member of the GLIAC since the 2018–19 school year, at which time it adopted its current athletic branding as "Parkside". The Rangers were previously members of the Great Lakes Valley Conference (GLVC) from 1994–95 to 2017–18.

Nickname
UW–Parkside's nickname is the Rangers. The university's mascot, depicted by a brown bear in a Parkside jersey, is Ranger Bear. In January 2011 Ranger Bear qualified for the first time for the Universal Cheer Association Mascot Nationals, where he took third place.

Varsity teams

List of teams
 
 
Men's sports (7) 
Baseball
Basketball
Cross country
Golf
Soccer
Track and field
Wrestling

 
Women's sports (6) 
Basketball
Cross country
Soccer
Softball
Track and field
Volleyball

National championships

Team

Conference championships
Parkside teams have won GLVC championships in men's soccer (2000), women's cross country (2007) and women's soccer (2008).

UWP teams have yet to win a national championship at the Division II level. However, Ranger athletes have won a total of 5 individual NCAA championships: one in women's indoor track and field and four in wrestling.

References

External links